Sandbach is a civil parish in Cheshire East, Cheshire, England. It contains 78 buildings that are recorded in the National Heritage List for England as designated listed buildings. Of these, two are listed at Grade I, the highest grade, two are listed at Grade II*, the middle grade, and the others are at Grade II. The parish includes the market town of Sandbach, and the villages of Elworth, Ettiley Heath and Wheelock, and most of the listed buildings are in these settlements. These include houses, shops, public houses, churches, a school, public and commercial buildings and structures associated with them. The most important listed structure in the parish are the two 9th-century Sandbach Crosses, which were recorded in the town in the mid-16th century and were reinstalled in the Market Square in 1816. The other Grade-I-listed building is Old Hall Hotel, a timber-framed building dating from 1656, on the site of a former manor house. One of the earliest public houses in the parish is the Black Bear Inn, a timber-framed building of 1634 that is listed at Grade II*. Several buildings in and around Sandbach are by George Gilbert Scott. These include Sandbach School, which dates from 1849 to 1851 and is in Tudor Revival style; its lodge is in Gothic Revival style. Scott also designed the town's Literary Institute and a set of almshouses. He rebuilt the Grade-II*-listed St Mary's Church in Sandbach, and designed St John the Evangelist's Church in Sandbach Heath. Sandbach Town Hall and Market Hall (1889) was designed by Thomas Bower.

The rest of the parish is rural, and the listed buildings here consist of farmhouses and farm buildings. The Trent and Mersey Canal runs through the parish and several listed buildings are associated with it, including bridges, locks, mileposts, accommodation for canal workers, a stable and ticket office, and a warehouse. More unusual listed structures include three war memorials, a drinking fountain and a telephone kiosk.

Key

Buildings

See also

Listed buildings in Bradwall
Listed buildings in Brereton
Listed buildings in Betchton
Listed buildings in Hassall
Listed buildings in Haslington
Listed buildings in Moston

References
Citations

Sources

 
Listed buildings in the Borough of Cheshire East
Lists of listed buildings in Cheshire